The Renegade Twins are a professional wrestling tag team currently performing in National Wrestling Alliance (NWA). The team consists of real life twin sisters Charlette and Robin Williamson (born April 14, 2000), known by their ring names Charlette Renegade and Robyn Renegade respectively. They are the former one-time NWA World Women's Tag Team Champions.

History
The Renegade Twins debuted in All Elite Wrestling on the January 11, 2022 episode of AEW Dark where they faced TayJay (Anna Jay and Tay Conti) in a losing effort. They appeared again on the March 28 episode of AEW Dark: Elevation where they faced the team of Anna Jay and Ruby Soho where they also lost. On the July 19 episode of AEW Dark, they had their first win AEW when they defeated Avery Breaux and Valentina Rossi.

On the December 24, 2022 episode of the NWA Christmas Special, The Renegade Twins made their NWA debut, losing to the NWA World Women's Tag Team Champions Pretty Empowered (Ella Envy and Kenzie Paige). On the February 7, 2023 episode of NWA Powerrr, they defeated Pretty Empowered, which earned the twins a title shot at Nuff Said. On February 11, at Nuff Said, the Renegade Twins defeated Pretty Empowered to win the NWA World Women's Tag Team Championship,but the lost the titles on the February 21st episode of NWA Powerrr to Pretty Empowered 2.0.

Championships and accomplishments
Capital Championship Wrestling
CCW Tag Team Championship (1 time)
Mission Pro Wrestling
MPW Tag Team Championship (1 time)
National Wrestling Alliance
NWA World Women's Tag Team Championship (1 time)
 Pro Wrestling Illustrated
 Ranked No. 73 of the top 100 Tag Teams in the PWI Tag Team 100 in 2022

References

2000 births
Living people
People from Dayton, Ohio
National Wrestling Alliance teams and stables
Independent promotions teams and stables
American female professional wrestlers
Identical twin females
American twins
Twin sportspeople
Women's wrestling teams and stables
Professional wrestlers from Ohio
21st-century American women
Twin performers